Ashwin Sundar (27 July 1985 – 18 March 2017) was a race driver from India. Most active during 2005 till recent years winning several national titles in Go-Kart, Single Seater Formula Cars, Two Wheelers and Saloon cars.

He was born on 27 July 1985 at Madras (now Chennai), Tamil Nadu.

Career

2003 – MRF Formula Mondial Go-Kart National champion
2004 – MRF Formula Mondial Go-Kart National champion
2004 – Debut in Single seater Formula Maruti (a.k.a.FISSME} (800cc) and Formula LGB (1300cc); 4th in Indian championship
2005 – 2nd runner-up in 150cc 4-stroke class, Ucal National Road Racing Championship
2006 – Indian champion in 115cc 4-stroke and 150cc 4-stroke class for TVS Racing & Second in adjudged Champion of Champions in India
2006 – 1st runner-up in FIM Asia Road racing championship in Underbone class (Under-21)
2006 – 2nd runner up in Formula LGB Hyundai and Formula LGB categories in Indian Championship
2007 – Indian champion in Formula LGB Hyundai and Formula LGB Swift categories
2009 – National Champion – Formula Rolon Chevrolet (1600cc) 
2010 – MRF Formula 1600 International Challenge champion
2011 – MRF Formula 1600 International Challenge champion
2012 – National Champion F4
2013 – National Champion F4

Death 
 
Sundar died on 18 March 2017 as the result of an auto accident. His car (BMW) caught fire after hitting a tree and got stuck between the tree and a wall on the roadside. He and his wife were killed in the fire.

References

Further reading
 High-octane drive – The Hindu 
 ‘09 RACING SEASON: IT’S A WRAP!  

Sundar wins Formula Rolon – Times of India 
 Ashwin proves class in JK Tyre racing championship | TwoCircles.net 
Remembering Ashwin Sundar, the man who took to racing like a duck to water https://scroll.in/field/832205/remembering-ashwin-sundar-the-man-who-took-to-racing-like-a-duck-to-water

1989 births
2017 deaths
Deaths from fire
Motorsport people from Chennai
Indian racing drivers
MRF Challenge Formula 2000 Championship drivers
Road incident deaths in India
ADAC Formel Masters drivers
Ma-con Motorsport drivers